Article 15 may refer to:

 Non-judicial punishment as authorized by Article 15 of the United States Uniform Code of Military Justice
 Article 15 of the Constitution of Singapore, which guarantees freedom of religion
 Article 15 (Democratic Republic of the Congo), a humorous French idiom common in the Democratic Republic of the Congo
 Article 15 (film), a 2019 Indian Hindi-language film